Elvis Phương, (born Phạm Ngọc Phương; Thủ Dầu Một; 1 February 1945) is a popular Vietnamese singer.

Life
Phương spent his youth in Saigon and became a popular performer in South Vietnam before having to leave following the fall of Saigon in 1975. In the 1990s, he started to take trips back to Vietnam on a regular basis, and again became a popular singer there. However, some Vietnamese refugee communities overseas were angered by his decision to perform in Vietnam and initially responded by boycotting and cancelling his performances.

References

Elvis Phương on Doligo Music 

20th-century Vietnamese male singers
1945 births
Living people